Konak İskele is a light-rail station on the Konak Tram of the Tram İzmir system in İzmir, Turkey. It is located on within the Konak Kent Park, in front of the Konak Terminal, from which the station gets its name. Transfer is available to the İzmir Metro at Konak station as well İzdeniz ferry service at Konak Ferry Terminal. To the east of the station is Konak Square and the İzmir Clock Tower as well as many governmental buildings along with the historical Kemeraltı marketplace.

Konak İskele station opened on 24 March 2018.

Connections
ESHOT operates city bus service on İnönü Avenue.

Nearby Places of Interest
Konak Square
İzmir Clock Tower
Kemeraltı
İzmir Art and Sculpture Museum

References

Railway stations opened in 2018
2018 establishments in Turkey
Konak District
Tram transport in İzmir